The Matra MS7 was a Formula Two racing car built by Matra, which occasionally raced in Formula One as well between  and .

While only modestly successful in Formula One, the car dominated Formula Two from late 1967 through 1969. Jacky Ickx, Jean-Pierre Beltoise and Johnny Servoz-Gavin won the European Championship in those years respectively, all driving the MS7 at least at some races.

Complete Formula One World Championship results
(key) (results in bold indicate pole position; results in italics indicate fastest lap)

1 One point scored by the MS7, all other points scored by the MS10.
2 No points scored by the MS7 as it was run in a Formula Two Category.

Non-Championship Formula One results
(key)

References

Further reading 
 José Rosinski: Matra. La Saga 1965–1982. E.T.A.I., Boulogne 1997, .

Matra MS007
Formula Two cars